Don Errick Montra "Donny" Harper (born March 13, 1978), who goes by the stage name D-Maub (Dedicated to Making All Underestimaters Believers), is an American Christian hip hop musician. His first studio album, Timeline, came out in 2005, with One Route Entertainment. D-Maub's second studio album, The Release, came out in 2008, also with One Route. His third studio album, Urban Legend, came out in 2008, again with One Route. The subsequent two studio albums were released on Dedicated Records, with 2010's Inside Out, and his Billboard chart debut album, Death Before Dishonor, in 2011. His most recent album, The Missing Peace, was released with One Route, and it charted on a Billboard chart, in 2013. He is the current president of One Route Entertainment.

Early life
D-Maub was born on March 13, 1978, as DonErrick Montra Harper, in Cincinnati, Ohio, where he still continues to reside. His father was Derrick Calvin Harper Sr., who died in 2017, and mother was Donna Lee Harper (née, Tucker). His mother died in 1997.

Personal life
He is married to Ciara Darnice Harper (née, Langford), they reside in Cincinnati, Ohio, with their children.

Music career
His first studio album, Timeline, came out in 2005, with One Route Entertainment. D-Maub's second studio album, The Release, came out in 2008, also with One Route. His third studio album, Urban Legend, came out in 2008, again with One Route. The subsequent two studio album's were released on Dedicated Records, with 2010's Inside Out, and his Billboard chart debut album, Death Before Dishonor, in 2011. His most recent album, The Missing Peace, was released with One Route, and it charted on a Billboard chart, in 2013. He is the current president of One Route Entertainment.

Discography

Studio albums

References

1978 births
Living people
African-American male rappers
African-American Christians
Musicians from Cincinnati
American performers of Christian hip hop music
Rappers from Cincinnati
21st-century American rappers
21st-century American male musicians
21st-century African-American musicians
20th-century African-American people